Dave Shirk is a visual effects supervisor. Shirk and his fellow visual effects artists are won the Academy Award for Best Visual Effects for the 2013 film Gravity.
He was also nominated for the 2018 film Ready Player One.

References

External links

Best Visual Effects Academy Award winners
Best Visual Effects BAFTA Award winners
Living people
Year of birth missing (living people)